Nil Abarbanel (born 19 June 1987) is a former Israeli footballer.

External links
 

1987 births
Living people
Israeli footballers
Hapoel Tel Aviv F.C. players
Bnei Yehuda Tel Aviv F.C. players
Hakoah Maccabi Amidar Ramat Gan F.C. players
Hapoel Bnei Lod F.C. players
Hapoel Ra'anana A.F.C. players
Hapoel Rishon LeZion F.C. players
Maccabi Petah Tikva F.C. players
Maccabi Kiryat Gat F.C. players
Maccabi Yavne F.C. players
Hapoel Jerusalem F.C. players
F.C. Holon Yermiyahu players
Israeli Premier League players
Liga Leumit players
Footballers from Tel Aviv
Association football goalkeepers